Reinis Kaudzīte (Old orthography: Reinis Kaudsit; May 12, 1839 – August 21, 1920), was a Latvian schoolteacher and writer. His novel Mērnieku laiki ("Time of the Surveyors") was the first novel written in Latvian, co-authored with his brother Matīss Kaudzīte in 1879.

Reinis Kaudzīte was born in "Mādari", Vecpiebalga Parish, in the heart of Vidzeme. He had not attended the school himself but became a teacher of geography and religion classes in Kalna Kaibēni parish school at the age of 28.

References

1839 births
1920 deaths
People from Cēsis Municipality
People from Kreis Wenden
Latvian writers